The 2008–09 Turkish Cup, also known due to sponsorship reasons as the Fortis Türkiye Kupası, was the 47th edition of the annual tournament that determined the association football Süper Lig Turkish Cup champion under the auspices of the Turkish Football Federation (TFF). (Beşiktaş) successfully contested Fenerbahçe in the final, 4–2. This tournament was conducted under the UEFA Cup system having replaced at the 44th edition a standard knockout competition scheme.  Beşiktaş completed the double having successfully won 2008–09 Süper Lig.

First round
The draw for the First Round was conducted at the headquarters of the TFF in İstanbul on 22 August 2008. The games were played on 3 and 4 September 2008.

Second round
The draw for the Second Round was conducted at the headquarters of the TFF in İstanbul on 12 September 2008. The games were played on 24 and 25 September 2008.

Group stage

The group stage consisted of four groups with five teams each. The four teams that finished first through fourth in 2007–08 Süper Lig were seeded as group heads: Galatasaray, Fenerbahçe, Beşiktaş and Sivasspor. The sixteen teams qualified through the first two rounds of elimination matches were randomly drawn into one of the four groups.

Every team played every other team of its group once, either home or away. The winners and runners-up of each group qualified for the quarterfinals. The games were played from 29 October 2008 to 18 January 2009.

Group A

Group B

Group C

Group D

Bracket

Quarter-finals
In this round entered winners and runners-up of all of the previous round's groups. The draw was conducted at the headquarters of the TFF in İstanbul on 19 January 2009. The first legs were played on 27 and 28 January 2009. The second legs were played on 3, 4 and 5 February 2009.

Semi-finals
The draw was conducted at the headquarters of the TFF in İstanbul on 18 February 2009. The first legs were played on 3 and 4 March 2009. The second legs were played on 21 and 22 April 2009.

Final

References

External links
 Official site 

2008-09
Cup
2008–09 domestic association football cups